General Thomson may refer to:

Herman O. Thomson (born 1929), U.S. Air Force lieutenant general
James Noel Thomson (1888–1979), British Army general
Mowbray Thomson (1832–1917), British East India Company general
Robert Thomson (British Army officer) (fl. 1980s–2020s), British Army major general
William Montgomerie Thomson (1877–1963), British Army lieutenant general

See also
General Thompson (disambiguation)